Heavens may refer to:
 The sky, low Earth orbit, or outer space (also celestial spheres or Biblical firmament)
 Heaven of general religious, theological, and metaphysical belief
 Seven Heavens a classic generally esoteric and metaphysical study of heaven
 Heavens (band), an American rock band
 Heavens (album), a 1987 album by Big Dipper
 "Heavens", a song by James from Seven

See also
 Heaven (disambiguation)
 Heavens Above!, a 1963 black-and-white British satirical comedy
 Heavens to Betsy, a punk rock band from Olympia, Washington